City at World's End is a BBC Books original novel written by Christopher Bulis and based on the long-running British science fiction television series Doctor Who. It features the First Doctor, Barbara, Ian, and Susan.

Plot

The Doctor and his three companions travel to Arkhaven. It is one of the last cities on a doomed alien planet. The city has one plan for survival, no backup. However, there are underlying plans threatening to sabotage this as various people vie for power the disaster might bring.

The Doctor then must deal with the 'Creeper', an entity prowling the outskirts of Arkhaven. His companions cannot help him, as one becomes lost and the other becomes mentally ill.

See also

An earlier novel with the same title, written by Golden Age U.S. science-fiction writer Edmond Hamilton, was first published in 1951 and republished in mass paperback in 1957. Hamilton's novel, which inspired Robert A. Heinlein's survivalist novel Farnham's Freehold.  Hamilton's novel begins when a distortion of the space-time continuum, caused by a super-atomic bomb explosion, catapults a U.S. midwestern community of 50,000 residents, called Middletown, into the remote future.

References

External links

1999 British novels
1999 science fiction novels
Past Doctor Adventures
First Doctor novels
Novels by Christopher Bulis
Novels set on fictional planets
Public domain books